BeyondTrust (formerly Symark) is an American company that develops, markets, and supports a family of privileged identity management / access management (PIM/PAM), privileged remote access, and vulnerability management products for UNIX, Linux, Windows and macOS operating systems.

BeyondTrust was founded in 2006 and provided Least Privilege Management software for the Microsoft Windows OS, before UNIX vendor Symark acquired BeyondTrust in 2009. In 2018, the company was acquired by Bomgar, a developer of remote support and PAM software. In both cases, BeyondTrust was adopted as the new company name.

History

Symark 
Symark was founded in 1985 as a VAX/VMS utility software company in Los Angeles' San Fernando Valley. Its name is derived from the initials of its founders, Bob Sommers and Doug Yarrow. Symark was also a client-server computing vendor, before later acquiring a license for the UNIX security product UPM (now owned by Quest Software) and rebranding their version PowerBroker. Symark relocated to Westlake Village, California, then again to Agoura Hills.

The company was focused on identity, access, and password management for privileged users on UNIX systems. From 2003—2008 the company expanded in Spain, Portugal, Japan and Latin America. During the same time period, they also grew almost 300 percent and were one of the fastest growing private companies in the Los Angeles area.

The original BeyondTrust 
In 2003, AutoProf introduced the AutoProf Policy maker, which was the first commercial product to build upon Microsoft's built-in Group Policy Objects to make common tasks like mapping network drives or sharing printer connections easier. In 2005, AutoProf grew 90% in revenue over the previous year and changed the company name to DesktopStandard. Four million desktops were under management of DesktopStandard's software across 3,500 customers. Between 2003—2005, DesktopStandard added six products to their portfolio for RBAC, password management, and identity access management on Windows. In 2006, Microsoft acquired most of DesktopStandard's products, and DesktopStandard's CEO formed a new company (BeyondTrust) around the remaining Policy Maker Application Security product.

Acquisitions 

2009: Symark acquired the Windows-based business of BeyondTrust in 2009 for approximately $20 million and they adopted BeyondTrust as the new company name.

2011: BeyondTrust acquired software from Likewise Software. The acquisition expanded its portfolio of "inside perimeter" security capabilities for Windows and Unix-based systems to include authentication and auditing management for cross-platform and cloud environments.

May 2012: BeyondTrust acquired Vulnerability Management Pioneer eEye Digital Security.

December 2012: BeyondTrust acquired Blackbird Group.

September 2014: Veritas Capital acquired BeyondTrust for $310 million.

October 2018: Bomgar acquired BeyondTrust from Veritas.

Bomgar

Bomgar was a remote support provider that allows support technicians to remotely connect to end-user systems through firewalls from their computer or mobile device. Using the Bomgar Representative Console, technology support professionals can access and control systems and devices remotely, including personal computers, smartphones, tablets, servers, switches, point-of-sale systems and others.

The company originated when Joel Bomgaars developed his own remote support solutions to cut back on wasted hours he spent travelling while working as a support professional for a local company. In June 2003, he set up a one-page, static website selling his own, home-grown remote access solution, calling it ExpertVNC. Soon thereafter, his two college friends, Nathan McNeill and Patrick Norman, joined Bomgar as co-founders.

In May 2004, ExpertVNC changed its name to NetworkStreaming. In the next month it changed its cloud-based product to an appliance model, differentiating itself from other similar remote support solutions.

In February 2007, NetworkStreaming changes its company name to Bomgar, a simplified form of Joel Bomgaars' family name that he also chose to use professionally for himself.

Bomgar's first private equity investors, TA Associates, placed a majority investment in Bomgar in May 2014.

In April 2018, Francisco Partners announced that it acquired Bomgar from Thoma Bravo, which owned Bomgar since June 2016. Financial details of this deal were not disclosed.

Bomgar now operates under the name BeyondTrust.

See also
 Remote support
 Comparison of remote desktop software
 Remote desktop software
 Virtual help desk

References

External links
Bomgar
Bomgar Community

Security companies of the United States
Companies based in Los Angeles County, California
Companies based in Rockingham County, New Hampshire
Computer security software
Unix security-related software
Information technology companies of the United States
Companies based in Carlsbad, California